Kader Silia (born 19 January 1979) is an Algerian wrestler. He competed in the men's Greco-Roman 76 kg at the 2000 Summer Olympics.

References

External links
 

1979 births
Living people
Algerian male sport wrestlers
Olympic wrestlers of Algeria
Wrestlers at the 2000 Summer Olympics
Place of birth missing (living people)
21st-century Algerian people
20th-century Algerian people